Krismoir Sajise Rosales (born December 20, 1990) is a Filipino-American professional basketball player for the NLEX Road Warriors of the Philippine Basketball Association (PBA). He was drafted 19th overall in the 2015 PBA draft by the Barako Bull Energy.

Early life and amateur career
Rosales started playing basketball at the age of 4 in his backyard. His father, Nielon Rosales, built a basketball court for him and his older brother, Nayton. At the age of 7 he joined his first basketball league in the city of Bellflower, California. He played a year of junior varsity and three years of varsity basketball at St. John Bosco High School under Coach Chris Madigan. After graduating high school in 2009 he accepted a scholarship from coach Bill Czech to play at NAIA Division 1 school at Hope International University in Fullerton, California.

College career 
In Rosales' freshman year, he played in all 30 games with 28 starts for the Royals. He scored a season high 26 points against San Diego Christian Hawks. He missed a triple double by two rebounds with 10 points, 10 assists, and 8 rebounds in season finale against Biola. They were in last place that season.

As a sophomore, Rosales led the team with 1.7 steals per game and placed 4th in the entire GSAC steals leaderboard. He scored a season high 24 points against the Concordia Golden Eagles a game after scoring 23 points against Westmont. He then grabbed a career high nine rebounds in the season finale against the Trinity Christian Trolls.

In his junior year, Rosales started all 30 games. He was in the top 5 for the entire GSAC in assists, steals, and minutes per game. He also set new career-highs in points and assists with 30 and 12 respectively in different games.

In 2013, Rosales became Hope’s first Golden State Athletic Conference Player of the Year, and the first Royal in the program’s then-near 60-year history to receive first-team National Association of Intercollegiate Athletics honors. They also qualified for the NAIA National Tournament that season. He finished his college career as Hope International's eighth-leading scorer and one of three players in the program's history with more than 1,500 points and 400 assists.

Professional career
Rosales worked out for the Toronto Raptors twice, once in Fullerton and the other in Los Angeles. He also worked out for the Sacramento Kings at a local high school in Sacramento. He also worked out with the Los Angeles Clippers at their practice facility and a day later he flew to New Jersey to work out with the Brooklyn Nets at their facility.

PBA D-League
On October 30, 2014, after going undrafted in the 2013 NBA D-League Draft and a hardluck campaign to make it to the NBA D-League, Rosales made his PBA D-League debut as the part of Jumbo Plastic Linoleum Giants. He helped the Giants to win their game against Bread Story−LPU Smashing Bakers with a score of 79–74. Rosales also played for Tanduay Light Rhum Masters for four games in the 2015 PBA D-League Foundation Cup but his team felt short at the quarterfinals.

ABL 
In 2015 Rosales was recruited by the Singapore Slingers of the ASEAN Basketball League (ABL) where he led the Slingers to a runner-up finish. He was awarded Player of the Week after finishing with 20 points on 50% from the field, 5 rebounds, 5 assists, and a steal in a win over the Saigon Heat. He averaged 10 points, 3.2 assists, and 1.4 steals per game during the ABL’s regular season.

PBA 
Rosales was drafted 7th in the second round and 19th overall by the Barako Bull Energy also known now as the Phoenix Fuel Masters during the 2015 PBA draft. The Fuel Masters were unable to sign him due to the team's heavy guard rotation.

TNT Katropa 
Rosales then signed a -year deal with the TNT Katropa after his stint in the ABL. In just his second career PBA game, Rosales recorded 13 points on 4 for 8 shooting from the field in just 22 minutes of playing time.

In his sophomore season, Rosales scored 15 points in a loss to the NLEX Road Warriors. He also took part in the Obstacle Challenge during the 2017 PBA All-Star Week. He scored 15 points once again as he temporarily became a starter with Jayson Castro busy with national team duties. That season, TNT made it to the 2017 Commissioner's Cup Finals. In Game 5, he had a PBA career-high 16 points off the bench, but TNT still lost to the San Miguel Beermen. San Miguel clinched the Finals the following game. In the Governors' Cup, he injured his knee and was declared out for the rest of the season.

Rain or Shine Elasto Painters 
Rosales was then traded along with Sidney Onwubere and a 2018 first-round pick in exchange for Jericho Cruz. After two surgeries, he was able to play for Rain or Shine. He helped RoS win its fourth straight game in the 2019 Philippine Cup with his 16 points. In that year's Governors' Cup, he had 18 points, three rebounds and three steals in a loss to NLEX.

In the 2020 Philippine Cup, Rosales had 15 points and six rebounds in their first win of the season, which was against San Miguel. He then had a team-high 14 points and eight rebounds in a loss to the Magnolia Hotshots. After the season, it was announced that Rain or Shine would not be renewing his contract.

NLEX Road Warriors 
Rosales took to coaching basketball for fourth graders while staying in shape while he was unsigned. He was then signed by the NLEX Road Warriors. He was expected to fill in for Kiefer Ravena, who had left the team to play in Japan, and be a backcourt partner for Kevin Alas. In his NLEX debut, he had nine points, three rebounds, and three assists in 19 minutes of a win over SMB. He dislocated his pinky against the Meralco Bolts, but he was still cleared to play. In a win over the Blackwater Elite, he matched his PBA career-high of 18 points while also giving four assists and two steals. 

The following season, Rosales had a PBA career-high 29 points on seven threes, but NLEX still lost to the Converge FiberXers. He missed Game 1 of their Philippine Cup quarterfinal against Magnolia due to health and safety protocols. He then missed some games in that year's Commissioner's Cup due to a calf strain, including the debut of his new coach Frankie Lim. Against the Bay Area Dragons, he had 12 points as the Dragons beat them by 20 points.

Career statistics

PBA 
As of the end of 2022–23 season
|-
| align=left | 
| align=left | TNT
| 16 || 17.3 || .397 || .375 || .871 || 1.9 || 2.9 || .4 || .0 || 5.7
|-
| align=left | 
| align=left | TNT
| 43 || 14.5 || .446 || .370 || .674 || 1.3 || 1.2 || .2 || .0 || 5.2
|-
| align=left | 
| align=left | Rain or Shine
| 45 || 18.2 || .339 || .301 || .735 || 2.1 || 1.5 || .6 || .0 || 4.7
|-
| align=left | 
| align=left | Rain or Shine
| 12 || 18.9 || .307 || .226 || .750 || 4.0 || 1.8 || .4 || .1 || 5.2
|-
| align=left | 
| align=left | NLEX
| 17 || 19.6 || .444 || .419 || .850 || 2.2 || 1.9 || 1.3 || .1 || 7.2
|-
| align=left | 
| align=left | NLEX
| 34 || 22.8 || .377 || .293 || .558 || 2.4 || 2.5 || .6 || .1 || 7.6
|-class=sortbottom
| align="center" colspan=2 | Career
| 167 || 18.3 || .385 || .324 || .717 || 2.1 || 1.8 || .6 || .0 || 5.8

College

Personal life 
In 2020, Rosales started the Creative Hoop Project, a small business that combines his other interests, basketball, skating, and coffee.

Rosales is married to Hillary Brown, who was his girlfriend for 14 years. His brother-in-law Jared Brown is set to play for the Ateneo Blue Eagles.

References

External links
Kris Rosales on Twitter

1990 births
Living people
American expatriate sportspeople in Singapore
American men's basketball players
American sportspeople of Filipino descent
Basketball players from California
Filipino expatriate basketball people in Singapore
Filipino men's basketball players
People from Bellflower, California
Point guards
Singapore Slingers players
TNT Tropang Giga players
Rain or Shine Elasto Painters players
Barako Bull Energy draft picks
NLEX Road Warriors players
Citizens of the Philippines through descent